Antonio Jesús Soto Guirao (born 15 February 1996) is a Spanish cyclist, who currently rides for UCI ProTeam .

Major results
2020
 9th Overall Vuelta a Murcia
2021 
 1st Vuelta a Murcia
 10th Circuito de Getxo
2022
 5th Clàssica Comunitat Valenciana 1969
2023
 5th Trofeo Ses Salines–Alcúdia
 6th Clàssica Comunitat Valenciana 1969

Grand Tour general classification results timeline

References

External links

1994 births
Living people
Spanish male cyclists
People from Alcantarilla
Cyclists from the Region of Murcia